Ptenín is a municipality and village in Plzeň-South District in the Plzeň Region of the Czech Republic. It has about 200 inhabitants.

Administrative parts
The village of Újezdec is an administrative part of Ptenín.

Notable people
Ferdinand Johann von Morzin (1756–1805), Austrian infantry commander

References

Villages in Plzeň-South District